The Fantasy Stakes is a Grade III American Thoroughbred horse race for three-year-old fillies at a distance of one and one-sixteenth miles on the dirt run annually usually in early April at Oaklawn Park Race Track in Hot Springs, Arkansas.  The event currently offers a purse of $600,000.

History

The inaugural running of the event was on 6 April 1973 and was won by Robert E. Lehmann's Knitted Gloves coming from behind by  lengths in a time of 1:42.

After three runnings the event was upgraded to Grade II status in 1976 and in 1978 was once again upgraded to a Grade I, signifying that the race was a major event for the three-year-old fillies. Between 1978 and 1989 the event held this classification and in that time some impressive winners include Davona Dale in 1979 who captured the U.S. Filly Triple Crown becoming the U.S. Champion three-year-old filly, the 1980 winner and US Hall of Fame inductee Bold 'n Determined. The 1980 US Champion two-year-old filly Heavenly Cause won this event in her sophomore season. Other champions to win this event were Tiffany Lass, the 1986 U.S. Champion three-year-old filly and the 1987 winner Very Subtle who later that year would win the Breeders' Cup Sprint at Hollywood Park Racetrack.

In 1990, the event was downgraded to Grade II status and held this status until the 2012 running and the next year it was reclassified as Grade III

The 2008 winner Eight Belles won the event as a short 1/2 odds-on favorite in a four-horse field. Later that spring Eight Belles would be tragically euthanized after finishing second in the 2008 Kentucky Derby.

Two winners of this event have gone on to defeat their male counterparts in Triple Crown events. Rachel Alexandra, the winner in 2009 by the stakes record of  lengths went on to win the Preakness Stakes. She would later be crowned the US Horse of the Year. Also Swiss Skydiver, the 2020 winner would go on and win the Preakness Stakes defeating the Kentucky Derby winner Authentic.

The event is a prep race to the Triple Tiara of Thoroughbred Racing, including the Kentucky Oaks, Black-Eyed Susan Stakes and Mother Goose Stakes.

Records
Speed record:
 1:41.20 – My Darling One (1984)

Margins:
  lengths – Rachel Alexandra (2009)

Most wins by a jockey:
 4 – Chris McCarron (1984, 1987, 1989, 1992)

Most wins by a trainer:
 4 – Steve Asmussen (2016, 2017, 2019, 2021)

Most wins by an owner:
 3 –  Fox Hill Farms  (2005, 2008, 2011)

Winners

Notes:

† In the 1987 running, Up The Apalachee, was first past the post but was disqualified and placed second. Very Subtle was declared the winner.

See also
Road to the Kentucky Oaks
List of American and Canadian Graded races

External links
 Oaklawn Park Media Guide 2020

References

1973 establishments in Arkansas
Horse races in Arkansas
Oaklawn Park
Flat horse races for three-year-old fillies
Graded stakes races in the United States
Recurring sporting events established in 1973
Grade 3 stakes races in the United States